Italian singer Eros Ramazzotti has received many Italian and international awards and nominations for his music work. It includes winning as Best Italian Artist three times (1997, 2001 and 2004) and Best Italian Pop/Rock Male Artist (2003) during the World Music Awards. He also was nominated International Male Artist of the Year six times during the Echo Awards (1997, 1998, 1999, 2002, 2004, 2013).

BMI Latin Awards

|-
|rowspan="1" scope="row"| 1997
|scope="row"| "La cosa más bella"
|rowspan="3" scope="row"| Award-winning songs
| 
|-
|rowspan="1" scope="row"| 1998
|scope="row"| "Estrella gemela"
| 
|-
|rowspan="1" scope="row"| 2005
|scope="row"| "Una emoción para siempre"
| 
|-

Echo Awards

|-
| style="text-align:center;"| 1997 ||style="text-align:left;"| Eros Ramazzotti || International Male Artist of the Year  || 
|-
| style="text-align:center;"| 1998 ||style="text-align:left;"| Dove c'è musica || International Male Artist of the Year || 
|-
| style="text-align:center;"| 1999 ||style="text-align:left;"| Eros || International Male Artist of the Year  || 
|-
| style="text-align:center;"| 2002 ||style="text-align:left;"| Stilelibero || International Male Artist of the Year || 
|-
| style="text-align:center;"| 2004 ||style="text-align:left;"| 9 || International Male Artist of the Year || 
|-
| style="text-align:center;"| 2013 ||style="text-align:left;"| Noi || International Male Artist of the Year || 
|-

Goldene Kamera

|-
| style="text-align:center;"| 2011 ||style="text-align:left;"| Eros Ramazzotti || Best International Music Artist  || 
|-

Italian Music Awards

|-
| style="text-align:center;" rowspan="3"| 2001February ||style="text-align:left;"| Eros Ramazzotti || Best Italian Male Artist  || 
|-
|style="text-align:left;"| Stilelibero || Best Italian Male Artist || 
|-
|style="text-align:left;"| "Fuoco nel fuoco" || Best Italian Videoclip || 
|-
| style="text-align:center;" rowspan="2"| 2001November ||style="text-align:left;"| Eros Ramazzotti || Best Italian Male Artist  || 
|-
|style="text-align:left;"| Stilelibero Tour || Best Tour || 
|-
| style="text-align:center;" rowspan="3"| 2003 ||style="text-align:left;"| Eros Ramazzotti || Best Italian Male Artist  || 
|-
|style="text-align:left;"| 9 || Best Italian Album || 
|-
|style="text-align:left;"| "Un'emozione per sempre" || Best Italian Video || 
|-

Lo Nuestro Awards

|-
|rowspan="1" scope="row"| 1994
|scope="row"| "Otra como tú"
|scope="row"| Video of the Year
| 
|-
|rowspan="3" scope="row"| 1997
|scope="row"| "La aurora"
|scope="row"| Video of the Year
| 
|-

Los Premios 40 Principales

|-
|style="text-align:center;"| 2008 ||style="text-align:left;"| "No estamos solos" (with Ricky Martin) || Best International Spanish-Language Song || 
|-

MTV Europe Music Awards

|-
|style="text-align:center;"| 1996 ||style="text-align:left;"| Eros Ramazzotti || Best Male || 
|-

MTV Video Music Awards

|-
|style="text-align:center;"| 1996 ||style="text-align:left;"| "La cosa más bella" || Viewer's Choice Award for MTV Latin America || 
|-

Premio Ondas

|-
|style="text-align:center;"| 2012 ||style="text-align:left;"| "Eros Ramazzotti" || Career Award || 
|-

NIAF Awards

|-
|style="text-align:center;"| 2008 ||style="text-align:left;"| Eros Ramazzotti || Career Award || 
|-

Premio Italiano della Musica

|-
| style="text-align:center;"| 2001 ||style="text-align:left;"| Eros Ramazzotti || Best Italian Male Artist  || 
|-
| style="text-align:center;"| 2002 ||style="text-align:left;"| Eros Ramazzotti || Best Italian Male Artist  || 
|-

Premio Videoclip Italiano

|-
| style="text-align:center;"| 2007 ||style="text-align:left;"| Eros Ramazzotti || Special Award for Music-Video Communication  || 
|-

Telegatto Awards

|-
| style="text-align:center;"| 1993||style="text-align:left;"| Eros Ramazzotti || Best Male Singer  || 
|-
| style="text-align:center;"| 1994||style="text-align:left;"| Jovanotti Daniele Eros Tour (with Jovanotti and Pino Daniele) || Best Tour  || 
|-
| style="text-align:center;" rowspan="2"| 2006 ||style="text-align:left;"| Eros Ramazzotti || Platinum Award for the Italian Music Abroad  || 
|-
|style="text-align:left;"| Eros Ramazzotti || Best Singer  || 
|-
| style="text-align:center;"| 2007 || style="text-align:left;"| Calma Apparente World Tour 2006 || Best Tour  || 
|-
| style="text-align:center;" rowspan="2"| 2008 || style="text-align:left;"| e² || Best Album  || 
|-
| style="text-align:left;"| Eros Ramazzotti || Best Singer || 
|-

Wind Music Awards

|-
| style="text-align:center;"| 2008 ||style="text-align:left;"| e² || Album Award  || 
|-
| style="text-align:center;"| 2009 ||style="text-align:left;"| Ali e radici || Multi-platinum Award  || 
|-
| style="text-align:center;"| 2010 ||style="text-align:left;"| Ali e radici || Multi-platinum Award  || 
|-

World Music Awards

|-
| style="text-align:center;"| 1997||style="text-align:left;"| Eros Ramazzotti || Best Italian Artist  || 
|-
| style="text-align:center;"| 2001||style="text-align:left;"| Eros Ramazzotti || Best Italian Artist  || 
|-
| style="text-align:center;"| 2003||style="text-align:left;"| Eros Ramazzotti || Best Italian Pop/Rock Male Artist  || 
|-
| style="text-align:center;"| 2004||style="text-align:left;"| Eros Ramazzotti || Best Italian Artist  || 
|-

References

Ramazzotti, Eros
Awards